Ecoute is a standalone music player application for macOS and iOS. 
It was created by Louka Desroziers (Developer) and Julien Sagot (Interface Designer). The current version is 3.0.8 for macOS and 2.5.7 for iOS.

Mac version
Ecoute plays content from the iTunes library. Music, videos, and podcasts goes into this small application that does not require iTunes to be launched while it uses iTunes' music library, playlists, and related information such as MP3 metatags. Users may switch back and forth between using Ecoute and iTunes. Ecoute does not require separately importing music or information; it uses the same files that iTunes does.

Ecoute is a lightweight player. Features include the ability to search for missing artwork, and customizable themes. Users may share information about the music they are listening to on Facebook, Twitter, and Last.fm. Ecoute supports Growl alerts, so the listener can see exactly what is playing.

The Desktop Controller is a very simple controller that sits in the background of the desktop. It shows the Album artwork, along with the details of the track currently playing and provides access to the music navigation controls.

iOS version
The makers of Ecoute have launched an official iPhone app in the App Store, on 17 August 2012. Ecoute for iOS serves as a music player with Twitter integration, AirPlay support, music filters, podcast support, and more.

Reviews 
Nick Mead from Softonic summarised his review as follow: "Ecoute is an excellent, lightweight alternative to the increasingly bloated issues that you may have been having with iTunes". Federico Viticci from MacStories described the Mac OS X version of Ecoute as a "small, powerful alternative to iTunes". Lukas Hermann from MacStories described the iOS application as "the best music player for iOS". Shane Richmond from The Daily Telegraph also praised the iOS application, saying that it is "much more pleasant and user-friendly design than Apple's iPod app".

References

External links
Official website

MacOS media players
IOS software